Captain Richard Rundle Burges (or Burgess; 10 September 1754 – 11 October 1797) was a Royal Navy officer noted for his actions in the Battle of Camperdown, where he perished while commanding .

Career

Burges was commissioned as a lieutenant in the Royal Navy on 21 November 1772. While serving on  during the Anglo-French War, he was injured in the action of 18 October 1782 against the French ship .

As commander
Burges was posted as commander on 7 December 1782. He commanded a series of ships with this rank:
 HMS Keppel (7–15 December 1782)
 HMS Vaughan (15 December 1782 – 12 May 1783)
 HMS Savage (23 June 1786 – 13 Aug 1790)

As captain
The Commissioned Sea Officers of the Royal Navy listed Burges as a captain on 21 September 1790, after which he commanded a series of warships:
 Ferret
 Culloden
 Argo
 Ardent

As captain of Culloden, a 74-gun ship of the line, Burges participated in the Glorious First of June, where his ship suffered seven casualties (two dead and five wounded).

Burges gained command of Ardent, a third-rate 64-gun ship of the line, in 1797.

Battle of Camperdown and death
On 11 October, he participated in the Battle of Camperdown where he would lose his life. Serving under Admiral Adam Duncan, Burges and Ardent joined the northern of two divisions in the British fleet—including Duncan's flagship Venerable—which aimed for the Dutch flagship Vrijheid. When Venerable diverted south, Ardent attacked the larger Vrijheid alone. There she suffered more than a hundred casualties, including Burges himself, who was cut in two by a chain shot in the first ten minutes of battle. During the fight, Burges' men "fought like maniacs." Ardent suffered the most casualties of any British ship, over 12% of the total British losses in battle. In 1802, Burges was honored with a monument in St. Paul's Cathedral in London, documenting his action in the battle.

References 

 Posthumous engraving of Burges at the National Portrait Gallery
 Service record at threedecks.org
 Biography at morethannelson.com
 Commission and Warrant Book 6/23, 1783–1789 Aug.
 British Warships in the Age of Sail 1714–1792: Design, Construction, Careers and Fates (2007) 

1754 births
1797 deaths
Royal Navy personnel of the French Revolutionary Wars